Myrseth is a surname. Notable people with the surname include:

Bjørn Myrseth (born 1944), Norwegian businessman
Cecilie Myrseth (born 1984), Norwegian psychologist and politician
Jan Otto Myrseth (born 1957), Norwegian Lutheran bishop
Johnny Myrseth (1925–2012), Norwegian businessman and politician